The Chattanooga–Cleveland–Dalton, TN–GA Combined Statistical Area covers a total of thirteen counties – seven in southeast Tennessee, six in northwest Georgia. The combined statistical area consists of three metropolitan statistical areas – Chattanooga, Cleveland, and Dalton – as well as the Athens, Dayton, and Calhoun micropolitan statistical areas. At the 2010 census, the CSA had a population of 1,010,000.

Counties
 Bradley County, Tennessee
 Catoosa County, Georgia
 Dade County, Georgia
 Hamilton County, Tennessee
 Marion County, Tennessee
 McMinn County, Tennessee
 Murray County, Georgia
 Polk County, Tennessee
 Rhea County, Tennessee
 Sequatchie County, Tennessee
 Gordon County, Georgia
 Walker County, Georgia
 Whitfield County, Georgia

Communities

Places with more than 150,000 inhabitants
 Chattanooga, Tennessee (principal city)

Places with 20,000 to 50,000 inhabitants
 Cleveland, Tennessee (principal city)
 Dalton, Georgia (principal city)
 East Ridge, Tennessee

Places with 10,000 to 20,000 inhabitants
 Athens, Tennessee (principal city)
 Collegedale, Tennessee
 Middle Valley, Tennessee (CDP)
 Red Bank, Tennessee
 Calhoun, Georgia
 Soddy-Daisy, Tennessee
Fort Oglethorpe, Georgia

Places with 5,000 to 10,000 inhabitants
 Dayton, Tennessee
 Fairview, Georgia (CDP)
 Harrison, Tennessee (CDP)
 LaFayette, Georgia
 Signal Mountain, Tennessee
 Dunlap, Tennessee
 South Cleveland, Tennessee (CDP)

Places with 1,000 to 5,000 inhabitants

 Apison, Tennessee (CDP)
 Benton, Tennessee
 Riceville, Tennessee (CDP)
 Chattanooga Valley, Georgia (CDP)
 Chatsworth, Georgia
 Chickamauga, Georgia
 East Cleveland, Tennessee (CDP)
 Englewood, Tennessee
 Etowah, Tennessee
 Fairmount, Tennessee (CDP)
 Falling Water, Tennessee (CDP)
 Graysville, Tennessee
 Hopewell, Tennessee (CDP)
 Indian Springs, Georgia (CDP)
 Jasper, Tennessee
 Kimball, Tennessee
 Lakesite, Tennessee
 Lakeview, Georgia (CDP)
 Lone Oak, Tennessee (CDP)
 Lookout Mountain, Georgia
 Lookout Mountain, Tennessee
 Monteagle, Tennessee (partial)
 Mowbray Mountain, Tennessee (CDP)
 Powells Crossroads, Tennessee
 Ringgold, Georgia
 Rossville, Georgia
 Sale Creek, Tennessee (CDP)
 South Pittsburg, Tennessee
 Spring City, Tennessee
 Trenton, Georgia
 Varnell, Georgia
 Walden, Tennessee
 Whitwell, Tennessee
 Wildwood Lake, Tennessee (CDP)

Places with less than 1,000 inhabitants

 Calhoun, Tennessee
 Charleston, Tennessee
 Cohutta, Georgia
 Copperhill, Tennessee
 Tunnel Hill, Georgia
 Ducktown, Tennessee
 Eton, Georgia
 Flat Top Mountain, Tennessee (CDP)
 Niota, Tennessee
 Ooltewah, Tennessee (CDP)
 Orme, Tennessee
 Ridgeside, Tennessee
 New Hope, Tennessee

Other unincorporated places

 Bakewell, Tennessee
 Birchwood, Tennessee
 Carters, Georgia
 Cisco, Georgia
 Crandall, Georgia
 Delano, Tennessee
 Dennis, Georgia
 East Brainerd, Tennessee
 Farner, Tennessee
 Georgetown, Tennessee (partial)
 Hixson, Tennessee
 Kensington, Georgia
 McDonald, Tennessee
 Ocoee, Tennessee
 Old Fort, Tennessee
 Reliance, Tennessee
 Rocky Face, Georgia
 Rising Fawn, Georgia
 Ten Mile, Tennessee
 Tennga, Georgia
 Tilton, Georgia
 Turtletown, Tennessee
 Wildwood, Georgia

See also
 Tennessee statistical areas
 List of municipalities in Tennessee
 Georgia statistical areas
 List of municipalities in Georgia (U.S. state)

References

Metropolitan areas of Tennessee

Geography of Bradley County, Tennessee
Geography of Catoosa County, Georgia
Geography of Dade County, Georgia
Geography of Hamilton County, Tennessee
Geography of Marion County, Tennessee
Geography of McMinn County, Tennessee
Geography of Polk County, Tennessee
Geography of Sequatchie County, Tennessee
Geography of Walker County, Georgia
Metropolitan areas of Georgia (U.S. state)
Combined statistical areas of the United States